Jordan Attah Kadiri (born 11 March 2000) is a Nigerian professional footballer who plays as a forward for Lommel.

Club career
On 13 August 2019, after impressing on a week-long trial, Kadiri joined Allsvenskan side Östersund. He had previously played for Sunsel in the Nigerian lower leagues and had a loan spell with Nigeria Premier League side Nasarawa United.

On 25 August 2019, Kadiri made his professional debut for Östersund, coming on as a substitute in a 3–1 loss at home to AIK.

On 31 July 2020, Kadiri joined Belgian First Division B side Lommel on a four-year deal.

On 30 August 2021, Kadiri joined Norwegian club Strømsgodset on loan for the rest of the season. His loan was terminated after the season.

In February 2022, Kadiri rejoined his former club Östersund on a one-year loan deal. The deal was cut short in August 2022, however, due to Östersund suffering from financial difficulties.

Kadiri scored his first goal for Lommel in the 2022–23 season against RE Virton on 28 October 2022. He scored again against Beerschot on 6 November.

Career statistics

Club

References

External links
 
 Footballdatabase Profile
 Attah Kadiri at Lommel SK
 Attah Kadiri at Pro League

2000 births
Living people
Nigerian footballers
Association football forwards
Nasarawa United F.C. players
Nigeria Professional Football League players
Östersunds FK players
Lommel S.K. players
Allsvenskan players
Nigerian expatriate footballers
Expatriate footballers in Sweden
Nigerian expatriate sportspeople in Sweden